Daniel Driscoll may refer to:

 Daniel A. Driscoll (1875–1955), U.S. Representative from New York
 Daniel Patrick Driscoll (1862–1934), British army officer
 Joseph Driscoll (Canadian politician) (Daniel Joseph Driscoll, 1876–1942)
 Danny Driscoll (1855–1888), American criminal and co-leader of the Whyos Gang
Daniel Driscoll,author of "The 4 Paths to Success as a Federal Contractor "